Thomas Youlden (born 8 July 1949) is an English former footballer.

Youlden was educated at Holloway School. He played in the Football League for Aldershot, Portsmouth and Reading. Youlden spent the 1971 season on loan to the Dallas Tornado of the North American Soccer League. After his playing career was over he became a youth coach at Chelsea.

References

English footballers
English Football League players
Footballers from Islington (district)
1949 births
Living people
Arsenal F.C. players
Portsmouth F.C. players
Reading F.C. players
Aldershot F.C. players
Addlestone & Weybridge Town F.C. players
People educated at Holloway School
Association football defenders
Chelsea F.C. non-playing staff
Association football coaches